The William Randolph House is a historic house in Cross Plains, Tennessee, U.S.. It was built by William Randolph in 1816, and expanded by Captain William Villines in 1830. It served both as a private residence and as an inn; it was also the post office from 1828 to 1969. It has been listed on the National Register of Historic Places since October 30, 1973.

References

Houses completed in 1916
National Register of Historic Places in Robertson County, Tennessee